The 1995 Internazionali di Carisbo was a men's tennis tournament played on outdoor clay courts at the Cierrebi Club in Bologna in Italy and was part of the World Series of the 1995 ATP Tour. It was the 11th edition of the tournament and was held from 22 May through 28 May 1995. Unseeded Marcelo Ríos won the singles title.

Finals

Singles

 Marcelo Ríos defeated  Marcelo Filippini 6–2, 6–4
 It was Ríos' 1st singles title of his career.

Doubles

 Byron Black /   Jonathan Stark defeated  Libor Pimek /  Vincent Spadea 7–5, 6–3
 It was Black's 1st doubles title of the year and the 10th of his career. It was Stark's 3rd doubles title of the year and the 14th of his career.

References

External links
 ITF tournament edition details

Internazionali di Carisbo
Bologna Outdoor
1995 in Italian tennis